The 1982 Michigan Attorney General election was held on November 2, 1982. Incumbent Democrat Frank J. Kelley defeated Republican nominee and future Oakland County executive L. Brooks Patterson with 57.52% of the vote.

General election

Candidates
Major party candidates
Frank J. Kelley, Democratic
L. Brooks Patterson, Republican
Robert W. Roddis, Libertarian

Results

References

Attorney General
Michigan Attorney General elections
November 1982 events in the United States
Michigan